Paduka Sri Sultan Abdul Rahman I Muazzam Shah ibni al-Marhum Sultan Mahmud Syah Alam (born Tengku Jumaat Abdul Rahman) was the 17th Sultan and Yang di-Pertuan Besar of Johor and Pahang and their dependencies (who reigned from 1811–1819) and the first Sultan of Riau-Lingga and their dependencies (who reigned from 1811–1832).

Biography

Early life
Born in Hulu Riau (Tanjungpinang in present day) in 1780, Abdul Rahman Muazzam Syah was the son of the 15th Sultan of Johor, Mahmud Shah III with his third wife, Encik Mariam binti Dato' Hassan (died in Lingga, 1831), the daughter of a Bugis nobleman of Sindereng, South Sulawesi.

Personal life

The period of government

Sultan of Johor
The seizure of power in the Sultanate of Johor-Riau-Lingga had taken place when Abdul Rahman Muazzam Shah was inaugurated as the Sultan of Johor preceding his older brother of another mother, Hussein Shah (the eldest son of Mahmud Shah III). The inauguration of Abdul Rahman Muazzam Shah was strongly supported by the Dutch.

Sultan of Lingga
In 1818, with strong support from Yang di-Pertuan Muda of Johor-Riau, Raja Jaafar, Abdul Rahman Muazzam Shah was inaugurated as Sultan and Yang di-Pertuan Besar of Linga with the title of Sultan Abdul Rahman I Muazzam Shah ibni al-marhum Sultan Mahmud III Alam Shah. When his era of government, Riau-Lingga has become the centre of development and broadcasting of Islam. In 1823 AD, Sultan Abdul Rahman has established the Great Mosque in Penyengat Island in Riau Archipelago that still exists to this day.

References

Footnotes

Bibliography
 

|-

Sultans of Johor
House of Bendahara of Johor